Nurul Islam Bablu popularly known as Nurul Haque, is a Bangladeshi actor, known for his acting debut in the film Matir Moina, directed by Tareque Masud, which became Bangladesh's first film to compete for the Academy Award for Best Foreign Language Film in 2002. For this film he won a National Film Awards in Best Child Artist category in 2002.

Career
Bablu got his acting breakthrough in Tareque Masud's film Matir Moina in 2002.

Filmography

Awards and nominations

References

External links

Living people
20th-century Bangladeshi male actors
Bangladeshi male film actors
Best Child Artist Special Category National Film Award (Bangladesh) winners
1996 births